This is a list of prime ministers (officially chairmen of the Cabinet of Ministers) of the unrecognised Chechen Republic of Ichkeria, a pro-independence movement that controlled most of Chechnya from 1991 to 2000 (see First Chechen War, Second Chechen War).

Prime ministers of Ichkeria

Prime ministers in exile 

 Aslan Maskhadov (February 2000 — 8 March 2005)
 Abdul-Halim Sadulayev (23 August 2005 — 17 June 2006)
 Dokka Umarov (17 June 2006 — 11 October 2007)
 Akhmed Zakayev (2007 — present)

See also
Politics of Chechnya
Vice President of Ichkeria

References

Sources
World Statesmen.org – Chechnya in Rebellion

Politics of Chechnya
Chechen Republic of Ichkeria